Febo (or Febos) Moniz de Lusignan or simply Febo (or Febos) Moniz was a Portuguese nobleman.

Biography
He was the only child of Vasco Gil Moniz and his second wife, Eléonore de Lusignan, Princess of Cyprus.

He was a Reposteiro-Mór (a major footman at the royal household encharged with drawing and undrawing the curtains and hangings and treasurer of the store-house for furniture) of King Manuel I of Portugal and a Fidalgo of his royal household and Alcaide-Mór of Arraiolos.

Marriage and issue
He married Catarina or Maria da Cunha, daughter of Gonçalo Correia, third Lord of the Honour of Farelães, and wife Margarida de Prado, who was promised by King Manuel I of Portugal 6,000 crowns for the marriage, and had issue, three sons by marriage and one bastard son:
 Jerónimo Moniz
 António Moniz, died a child, young, unmarried
 Gil Aires Moniz, died a child, young, unmarried
 (bastard) Jerónimo Moniz, who was a Clergyman

Sources
 Manuel João da Costa Felgueiras Gaio, "Nobiliário das Famílias de Portugal", Tomo Vigésimo Primeiro, Título de Monizes, § 17, § 18 e § 19
 Various Authors, "Armorial Lusitano", Lisbon, 1961, pp. 370–372
 Augusto Romano Sanches de Baena e Farinha de Almeida Portugal de Sousa e Silva, 1.º Visconde de Sanches de Baena, "Archivo Heraldico-Genealógico", Lisbon, 1872, Volume II, p. CXV
 Cristóvão Alão de Morais, "Pedatura Lusitana", Volume I (reformulated edition), pp. 668–670

Portuguese nobility
Year of birth unknown
Year of death unknown
15th-century Portuguese people
16th-century Portuguese people